It's a Grand Old World is a 1937 British comedy film directed by Herbert Smith and starring Sandy Powell, Gina Malo and Cyril Ritchard. It was made at Beaconsfield Studios. The film's sets were designed by Norman Arnold.

Synopsis
An unemployed man wins the football pools, and decides to buy a country house for his actress girlfriend.

Cast
 Sandy Powell as Sandy 
 Gina Malo as Joan 
 Cyril Ritchard as Brian 
 Frank Pettingell as Bull 
 Garry Marsh as Stage Manager 
 Ralph Truman as Banks 
 Fewlass Llewellyn as Father 
 John Turnbull as Auctioneer 
 Iris Charles as Girl in the Car

References

Bibliography
 Low, Rachael. Filmmaking in 1930s Britain. George Allen & Unwin, 1985.
 Wood, Linda. British Films, 1927-1939. British Film Institute, 1986.

External links

1937 films
British comedy films
British black-and-white films
1937 comedy films
Films directed by Herbert Smith
Films shot at Beaconsfield Studios
Films set in England
1930s English-language films
1930s British films